Novobikkino (Yañı Bikkenä) is a rural locality (a selo) in Chekmagushevsky District, Bashkortostan, Russia. The population was 211 as of 2010. There are 2 streets.

Geography 
Novobikkino is located 10 km south of Chekmagush (the district's administrative centre) by road. Rapatovo is the nearest rural locality.

References 

Rural localities in Chekmagushevsky District